Brittany Breayley-Nati (née Breayley; born 7 February 1991) is an Australian rugby league footballer who plays for the Burleigh Bears in the QRL Women's Premiership, and Ormeau Shearers in the SEQW Holcim cup.

Background
Born in Mackay, Queensland, Breayley-Nati is of Māori descent and began playing rugby league for the Mackay Magpies in 2008.

Playing career
In 2014, while playing for the North Ipswich Tigers, Breayley-Nati made her representative debuts for Australia and Queensland.

In 2017, she won the Queensland Women's Representative Player of the Year at the QRL Major Competition Awards. On 2 December 2017, she started at hooker in Australia's 2017 Women's Rugby League World Cup final win over New Zealand.

In June 2018, Breayley-Nati, along with Ali Brigginshaw, Heather Ballinger, Teuila Fotu-Moala and Caitlyn Moran, were named as the five marquee players for the Brisbane Broncos  NRL Women's Premiership team. 

In September 2018, she was named Female Player of the Year at the 2018 Dally M awards.

In 2019, Breayley-Nati joined the St George Illawarra Dragons. On 6 October 2019, she started at hooker in the Dragons' 6–30 Grand Final loss to the Broncos.

In February 2020, she was member of the Dragons' NRL Nines winning squad. Breayley sat out the 2020 NRL Women's season due to family and work commitments.

Achievements and accolades

Individual
QRL Representative Player of the Year: 2016, 2017
Dally M Medal: 2018
Brisbane Broncos Player of the Year: 2018
Brisbane Broncos Best Forward: 2018

Team
2017 Women's Rugby League World Cup: Australia – Winners
2018 NRLW Grand Final: Brisbane Broncos – Winners

References

External links
QRL profile

1991 births
Living people
Australia women's national rugby league team players
Australian female rugby league players
Australian people of Māori descent
Brisbane Broncos (NRLW) players
Rugby league hookers
Rugby league players from Mackay, Queensland
St. George Illawarra Dragons (NRLW) players